Dera Dida Yami (born 26 October 1996) is an Ethiopian long distance runner. She competed in the women's 10,000 metres at the 2017 World Championships in Athletics, ranking 14th in 31:51:75. In 2019, she won the silver medal in the senior women's race at the 2019 IAAF World Cross Country Championships held in Aarhus, Denmark. At the 2019 African Games, she won the bronze medal in the women's 10,000 metres event.

Achievements

Personal bests
 5000 metres – 14:42.84 (Rome 2016)
 10,000 metres – 30:51.86 (Hengelo 2019)
Road
 5 kilometres – 15:24 (Rennes 2015)
 10 kilometres – 33:00 (Okpekpe 2018)
 Half marathon – 1:08:06 (Houston, TX 2017)
 Marathon – 2:21:45 (Dubai 2018)

National championships
 Ethiopian Athletics Championship titles
 5000 metres: 2016
 10,000 metres: 2017

References

External links

1996 births
Living people
Ethiopian female long-distance runners
World Athletics Championships athletes for Ethiopia
Place of birth missing (living people)
African Games medalists in athletics (track and field)
African Games bronze medalists for Ethiopia
Athletes (track and field) at the 2019 African Games
21st-century Ethiopian women